Coșeni may refer to:

 Coșeni, a village in Sfântu Gheorghe city, Covasna County, Romania
 Coșeni, a village in Negurenii Vechi commune, Ungheni District, Moldova